Board or Boards may refer to:

Flat surface
 Lumber, or other rigid material, milled or sawn flat
 Plank (wood)
 Cutting board
 Sounding board, of a musical instrument
 Cardboard (paper product)
 Paperboard
 Fiberboard
 Hardboard, a type of fiberboard
 Particle board, also known as chipboard
 Oriented strand board
 Printed circuit board, in computing and electronics
 Motherboard, the main printed circuit board of a computer
 A reusable writing surface
 Chalkboard
 Whiteboard

Recreation
 Board game
Chessboard
Checkerboard
 Board (bridge), a device used in playing duplicate bridge
 Board, colloquial term for the rebound statistic in basketball
 Board track racing, a type of motorsport popular in the United States during the 1910s and 1920s
 Boards, the wall around a bandy field or ice hockey rink
 Boardsports
 Diving board (disambiguation)

Companies
 Board International, a Swiss software vendor known for its business intelligence software toolkit
 Bureau of Architecture, Research, and Design (BOARD), an architecture firm based in Rotterdam

Groups
 Advisory board, a body that provides non-binding strategic advice to the management of a corporation
 Currency board, the monetary authority to maintain a fixed exchange rate with a foreign currency
 Board of directors, or a similar governing or advisory committee
 Board of selectmen, the executive arm of the government of New England towns in the United States
 Board of supervisors, a governmental body that oversees the operation of county government in some U.S. states
 Board of trustees, the authority of a nonprofit organization
 Editorial board, a group responsible for a publication's editorial policy
 Examination board, an organization that sets examinations, is responsible for marking them and distributes results
 Parole board, a panel that decides whether an offender should be released from prison
 Police board, a group charged with the responsibility of overseeing a local police force
 Supervisory board, a group responsible for hiring and firing a board of directors

People

Sports
 C. J. Board (born 1993), American football player
 Chris Board (born 1995), American football player
 Dwaine Board (born 1956), American football player and coach
 Jim Board (born 1956), Australian rules footballer 
 Michael Board (born 1970), British swimmer
 Terry Board (footballer, born 1945), Australian rules footballer
 Terry Board (footballer, born 1968), Australian rules footballer

Other areas
 Kate Board, English airship pilot
 Mike Board (born 1952), Australian politician
 Mykel Board (born 1950), American journalist, musician, and writer
 Printz Board (born 1982), American record producer, songwriter, and singer 
 Prudy Taylor Board (born 1933), American author and editor

Other
 Board book, a book made more durable by the use of cardboard covers and thicker paper
 Board certification, for medical professionals in the United States
 Board examination, a part of education in some countries
 Board foot, measurement of lumber volume
 Boards (magazine), a 1999–2010 trade publication for the advertising community
 boards.ie, an Internet forum in Ireland
 Bulletin board (disambiguation), where people can leave public messages
 Distribution board or breaker panel, a component of an electricity supply system
 Room and board, in exchange for money, labor, or other consideration, a person is provided with a place to live as well as meals
 "The Big Board", nickname of the New York Stock Exchange

See also 
 
 
 Boarding (disambiguation)
 Bored (disambiguation)
 Soundboard (disambiguation)
 Switchboard (disambiguation)